Diamond Island, now Thamihla Kyun, is off the coast of Burma at . It is in the Ayeyarwady Region and off Cape Negrais, which is also known as Pagoda Point or Mawdin Zoon, and marks the entrance to the Bassein River.

The island is the site of an active navigational light on a skeletal tower.

The island is a nesting place for green and loggerhead turtles. It is now one of the major nesting areas for Green turtles in Myanmar, and since 1986 there has been a conservation station on the island. In recent years the loss of mangroves has reduced turtle nesting sites. Cyclone Nargis, 2–3 May 2008, also damaged turtle nests and nesting sites.

History

In 1801 the British merchant ship Mermaid wrecked on a rock some miles from the island. On 7 November 1808 the East Indiaman  did so also.

A communications station, now closed, was established there. The station in 1908 was in radio contact with the Andaman Islands and had a telegraph connection to Bassein (now Pathein).

During World War II, in January 1942 the river steamer  evacuated the British radio operators on the island. On 6 March 1943, B-24s strafed the radio station while returning from an attack on shipping at Pagoda Point.

Citations and references
Citations

References
Imperial Gazetteer of India: Provincial Series, (1908), Volume 10, (Superintendent of Government Printing). 
Wireless Telegraph stations of the World (1912). (Washington: Government Printing Office).
 A list of Diamond Island plants (1890). (Journal of the Asiatic Society of Bengal, volume LIX, by D. Prain)

Islands of Myanmar
Lighthouses in Southeast Asia